The CU Mortgage Dakota Showcase was a college basketball event held in Sioux Falls, South Dakota at the Sanford Pentagon. It was a non-conference showcase that featured four Summit League men's basketball teams: North Dakota, North Dakota State, South Dakota State, and South Dakota. It was formed during the 2020–21 season as a way to add games to each team's schedule which were all majorly affected by the COVID-19 pandemic. No fans were allowed at the event and all of the teams followed COVID-19 protocols.

Teams

Game Results
December 10, 2020

December 11, 2020

December 12, 2020

References

College sports in South Dakota
College men's basketball competitions in the United States
College basketball competitions
2020 in sports in South Dakota
2020 establishments in South Dakota
Recurring sporting events disestablished in 2020